Hertha Sponer (1 September 1895 – 27 February 1968) was a German physicist and chemist who contributed to modern quantum mechanics and molecular physics and was the first woman on the physics faculty of Duke University. She was the older sister of philologist and resistance fighter Margot Sponer.

Life and career
Sponer was born in Neisse (Nysa), Prussian Silesia, and obtained her high school degree in Neisse. She spent a year at the University of Tübingen, after which she enrolled at the University of Göttingen where she received her PhD in 1920 under the supervision of Peter Debye. During her time at the University of Tübingen, she was an assistant of James Franck. In 1921 she, along with a few others, was among the first women to obtain a PhD in physics in Germany along with the right to teach science at a German university. In October 1925 she received a Rockefeller Foundation fellowship to stay at University of California, Berkeley, where she remained for a year. During her time at Berkeley, she collaborated with R. T. Birge, developing what is now called the Birge-Sponer method for determining dissociation energies.

By 1932 Sponer had published around 20 scientific papers in journals such as Nature and Physical Review, and had become an associate professor of physics. In 1933 James Franck resigned and left Göttingen and a year later she was dismissed from her position when Hitler came to power, due to the Nazis' stigma against women in academia. In 1934 Sponer moved to Oslo to teach at the University of Oslo as a visiting professor, and in 1936 she started her appointment at Duke University where she remained as a professor until 1966 when she became Professor Emeritus, a position she held until her death in 1968.

During her academic career, Sponer conducted research in quantum mechanics, physics, and chemistry. She authored and published numerous studies, many of which were in collaboration with famous physicists including Edward Teller. She made many contributions to science including the application of quantum mechanics to molecular physics and work on the spectra of near ultra-violet absorption. She set up a spectroscopy lab in the physics department of Duke University, which was later moved to its own new building.

Sponer married James Franck in 1946. She died in Ilten, Lower Saxony.

Selected publications

References

External links

1895 births
1968 deaths
20th-century American chemists
20th-century American physicists
20th-century American women scientists
American women chemists
American women physicists
Theoretical chemists
Theoretical physicists
Duke University faculty
Emigrants from Nazi Germany to the United States
20th-century German chemists
20th-century German physicists
German women chemists
German women physicists
People from the Province of Silesia
University of California, Berkeley faculty
University of Göttingen alumni
Academic staff of the University of Oslo
University of Tübingen alumni
American women academics
20th-century German women